This was the first edition of the tournament and first of two editions of the tournament to start the 2021 ATP Challenger Tour year.

Jaume Munar won the title after defeating Lorenzo Musetti 6–7(7–9), 6–2, 6–2 in the final.

Seeds

Draw

Finals

Top half

Bottom half

References

External links
Main draw
Qualifying draw

Antalya Challenger - 1